Reasonable Doubt: A Tale of Two Kidnappings is a 2021 Mexican true crime documentary miniseries, about four men who were arrested for being involved in a kidnapping following a car accident.

Episodes

References

External links
 
 

2020s Mexican television series
2021 Mexican television series debuts
Spanish-language Netflix original programming
Netflix original documentary television series